Arthur Charles Tomblin (May 1836 – 15 April 1911) was an English clergyman and a cricketer who played in four first-class matches for Cambridge University and the Gentlemen of the North team in 1857 and 1862. He was born at Empingham, Rutland and died at Kettering, Northamptonshire. The precise date of his birth is not known.

Tomblin was educated at Uppingham School and at Emmanuel College, Cambridge. As a cricketer, he was a left-handed middle- or lower-order batsman. He made an unbeaten 31 on his first-class debut for Cambridge University against the Marylebone Cricket Club, but achieved very little in his other games for the university, the last of which was the 1857 University Match, in which he scored 12 and 0. In 1862, Tomblin returned for a single further first-class game, a match between amateur teams from the North and the South of England, and made his highest score, 46, in his final first-class innings.

Tomblin graduated from Cambridge University with a Bachelor of Arts degree in 1858. He was ordained as a Church of England deacon in 1859 and as a priest the following year; he served as curate at Great Oakley, Northamptonshire from 1858 to 1863 when he became vicar of the same parish through to 1900. He continued to live in Great Oakley after his retirement. He died at Kettering in April 1911, aged 74.

References

External links

1836 births
1911 deaths
Cricketers from Rutland
People educated at Uppingham School
Alumni of Emmanuel College, Cambridge
Cambridge University cricketers
English cricketers
Gentlemen of the North cricketers
19th-century English Anglican priests
20th-century English Anglican priests